Pneumatic trail or trail of the tire is a trail-like effect generated by compliant tires rolling on a hard surface and subject to side loads, as in a turn. More technically, it is the distance that the resultant force of side-slip occurs behind the geometric center of the contact patch.

Causes
Pneumatic trail is caused by the progressive build-up of lateral force along the length of the contact patch, such that lateral forces are greater towards the rear of the contact patch (though less so when the rear of the contact patch begins sliding) and this creates a torque on the tire called the self aligning torque. Because the direction of the side-slip is towards the outside of a turn, the force on the tire is towards the center of the turn. Therefore, this torque tends to turn the front wheel in the direction of the side-slip, away from the direction of the turn.

Variation
Pneumatic trail is at its maximum when the slip angle is zero and decreases as slip angle increases. Pneumatic trail increases with vertical load.

See also
Bike physics
Camber thrust
Caster angle
Cornering force
Relaxation length

References

Vehicle technology
Tires
Motorcycle dynamics